Gold is an EP by American pop rock band Metro Station, released independently on October 14, 2014. The EP was made available for streaming exclusively via Billboard magazine on October 8, 2014. It was the band's first release after Trace Cyrus' return to the group in 2014.

Background
Gold was recorded between 2013 and 2014 with roughly 30 songs recorded before the band finalized the 5 tracks for the EP. Trace Cyrus said that the EP has a "more mature sound." "Love & War" was released on August 12, 2014 as the lead single along with an accompanying music video. "She Likes Girls" was released on September 9, 2014 as the second single. Speaking about the song, Cyrus said, "It's something a little different for us to write about. We definitely haven't written about something this risqué, I don't think." Mason Musso added, "I just thought it was an interesting idea and I've definitely heard of that scenario before. I just thought it really worked." The music video was released on October 31, 2014.

The group went on a co-headlining tour with the Ready Set in 2014 called "The Outsiders Tour" with supporting acts from the Downtown Fiction and Against the Current.

Critical reception

The EP was received with mixed reviews. Alyson Stokes of idobi Radio gave the album a 6/10 stars. She states, "Gold is great by Metro Station standards and serves as a promising step forward for the band, but there’s definitely room for more variety." She ends off remarking, "Gold ups the ante for Metro Station as a band, but overall boasts nothing more than good dance tracks. Andy Biddulph of Rock Sound magazine calls the EP, "half-decent, half teeth-grindingly awful."

Track listing

Personnel
Credits for Gold adapted from AllMusic.

Metro Station
 Trace Cyrus – vocals, lead guitar, keyboards, bass guitar
 Mason Musso – vocals, keyboards, rhythm guitar, synthesizers

Additional musicians
 Spencer Steffan – drums, percussion, backing vocals
 the Ready Set - featured artist

References

Metro Station (band) albums
Self-released EPs
2014 EPs